Annemieke Wilbrenninck-Fokke (born 4 November 1967 in Heemstede, North Holland) is a former Dutch field hockey player, who won the bronze medal with the National Women's Team at the 1988 Summer Olympics.

From 1987 to 1992 she played a total number of 95 international matches for Holland, in which she did not score. Fokke retired after the 1992 Summer Olympics in Barcelona, Spain, where the Dutch finished in sixth position.

References

External links
 

1967 births
Living people
Dutch female field hockey players
Olympic field hockey players of the Netherlands
Field hockey players at the 1988 Summer Olympics
Field hockey players at the 1992 Summer Olympics
Olympic bronze medalists for the Netherlands
People from Heemstede
Olympic medalists in field hockey
Medalists at the 1988 Summer Olympics
HGC players
Sportspeople from North Holland
20th-century Dutch women
21st-century Dutch women